Membathisi Mdladlana (born 12 May 1952 in Keiskammahoek, Eastern Cape) is a South African politician. He is the South African High Commissioner to Canada as of November 2012.

Political career

He was the Minister of Labour of South Africa since appointment by Nelson Mandela in 1998 till 2010. A teacher by training, Mdladlana earned a Bachelor of Arts from the University of South Africa in 1997 in education and the IsiXhosa language. From 1972 to 1981, Mdladlana was a teacher at Vukukhanye Primary School in Gugulethu, a township outside of Cape Town. From 1982 to 1994, he was the principal of Andile Primary School in Crossroads, Cape Town. In 1994, the Eastern Cape native was elected to the first multi-racial parliament in South African history with the African National Congress. In 1998, President Nelson Mandela appointed him to the position of Minister of Labour. He has served under four Presidents: Mandela, Thabo Mbeki, Kgalema Motlanthe, and Jacob Zuma.

References

1952 births
Living people
People from Keiskammahoek
Xhosa people
African National Congress politicians
Government ministers of South Africa
Members of the National Assembly of South Africa
South African schoolteachers
University of South Africa alumni
High Commissioners of South Africa to Canada